The Days is an American drama series that aired on ABC from July 18 until August 22, 2004. Each episode chronicles 24 hours in the lives of the members of the fictional Day family.

The series was produced for ABC by MindShare Worldwide, a GroupM media agency within WPP Group that financed the series in exchange for ABC advertising time.

Plot 
The plot revolves around a Philadelphia family, the Days.  The father, Jack Day (David Newsom) is a corporate lawyer who quits his job at a pharmaceutical company in the midst of a mid-life crisis.  His wife, Abby Day (Marguerite MacIntyre) has recently re-entered the work force as an executive for an advertising firm after taking time off to raise their children.  The couple's eldest child, daughter Natalie Day (Laura Ramsey), is homecoming queen, a soccer star, and the most popular girl in school, until she finds out she's pregnant.  Cooper Day (Evan Peters) is the middle child and an aspiring writer who counts the days until his graduation.  He begins and ends each episode with a monologue of an entry in his journal.  Nathan Day (Zachary Maurer) is the youngest child, a child prodigy, who attends a private school and frequently suffers panic attacks.

Cast
David Newsom as Jack Day
Marguerite MacIntyre as Abby Day
Evan Peters as Cooper Day
Laura Ramsey as Natalie Day
Zachary Maurer as Nathan Day

Episodes

References

External links 
 
 Review of the pilot episode from The New York Times

American Broadcasting Company original programming
English-language television shows
2004 American television series debuts
2004 American television series endings
2000s American drama television series
Television shows set in Philadelphia
Television shows filmed in Vancouver
WPP plc